Henry Perry may refer to:

Henry Perry (restaurateur) (1875–1940), restaurateur considered the "father of Kansas City barbecue"
Henry Perry (writer) (1560s–1617), Welsh Anglican priest and linguistic scholar
Henry Perry (British boxer), British boxer
Henry Perry (Irish boxer) (born 1934), member of the 1956 and 1960 Irish Olympic boxing teams

See also
Harry Perry (disambiguation)